Harald Christensen (28 May 1915 – 27 February 1945) was a member of the Danish resistance executed by the German occupying power.

Biography 

Harald Christensen was born in Faaborg 28 May 1915 as the eighth child of factory worker Niels Christensen and wife Maren Christine née Madsen and baptized in Faaborg church the seventh Sunday after Trinity.

In 1916 Christensen was living with his parents and siblings in Vestergade 29, Fåborg with his father supporting the family as a worker at Fåborg's wood wool factory with a permanently injured knee.

On 27 February 1945 Christensen and nine other resistance members were executed in Ryvangen.

After his death 

On 30 June 1945 at Vestre Kirkegaard a memorial service was held for him, as well as for the killed member of the resistance Estvan Svend Aage Wehlast.

On 29 August Christensen and 105 other victims of the occupation were given a state funeral in the memorial park founded at the execution and burial site in Ryvangen where he was executed. Bishop Hans Fuglsang-Damgaard led the service with participation from the royal family, the government and representatives of the resistance movement.

In 1950 his remains were moved, prior to the official inauguration of the Ryvangen Memorial Park on 5 May 1950. Remarkably, a second resistance member to also be removed from the memorial park was the above-mentioned Estvan Svend Aage Wehlast.

The official list of resistance members buried in Ryvangen does not include Christensen, nor Wehlast.

References 

1915 births
1945 deaths
Danish people of World War II
Danish resistance members
Danish people executed by Nazi Germany
Resistance members killed by Nazi Germany
People from Faaborg-Midtfyn Municipality
People executed by Nazi Germany by firing squad